The 1992 Kansas Jayhawks football team represented the University of Kansas as a member of the Big Eight Conference during the 1992 NCAA Division I-A football season. Led by fifth-year head coach Glen Mason, the Jayhawks compiled an overall record of 8–4 with a mark of 4–3 in conference play, placing third in the Big 8. Kansas was invited to the Aloha Bowl, where they beat BYU. The team played home games at Memorial Stadium in Lawrence, Kansas.

Schedule

Roster

References

Kansas
Kansas Jayhawks football seasons
Aloha Bowl champion seasons
Kansas Jayhawks football